Standoff is an American drama series that premiered on the Fox network on September 5, 2006. Created by Craig Silverstein, the series focused on an FBI Crisis Negotiation Unit whose members negotiated hostage situations and shared relationships. The show was produced by Sesfonstein Productions and 20th Century Fox Television and its executive producers were Craig Silverstein, Tim Story, and Glen Mazzara. A total of 18 episodes were produced and the series completed its original run on July 20, 2007.

Plot
The premise of the show was set up in the opening scene of the series pilot. In an attempt to connect with the hostage-taker, Matt Flannery (Ron Livingston), a negotiator for the FBI, reveals to him and his colleagues who are listening to his conversation, that he has been sleeping with his partner, Emily Lehman (Rosemarie DeWitt). Their supervisor Cheryl Carrera (Gina Torres) is concerned about how their relationship will affect their jobs. Each episode revolves around the main plot of a hostage situation and the subplot of Matt and Emily's relationship.  In the hostage situation, the FBI Crisis Negotiation Unit is typically called upon to deal with the hostage-taker.

Cast and characters

Although the series has six main characters, Matt Flannery and Emily Lehman are considered to be the protagonists of the series as a subplot concerning their relationship is featured in each episode.

 Matt Flannery (played by Ron Livingston) is a senior negotiator for the FBI Crisis Negotiation Unit at the bureau's Los Angeles field office. He is partnered with Emily Lehman, who is also his lover. He was born in Van Nuys, California and attended the University of California, Santa Barbara, where he obtained a Bachelor of Science in General Studies. Prior to joining the FBI, he worked as a police detective in the Violent Crimes Section of the Simi Valley Police Department and as a crisis negotiator of the department.
 Emily Lehman (played by Rosemarie DeWitt) is a senior negotiator for the Crisis Negotiation Unit at the Los Angeles field office of the Federal Bureau of Investigation. She is partnered with Matt Flannery, who is also her lover. She was born in Albany, New York and educated at Cornell University, where she graduated with Bachelor of Arts in Psychology. She then attained her Master's degree in Psychology and her Ph.D in Criminal Psychology/Forensic Psychology from Princeton University. Prior to working at the Los Angeles field office of the FBI, Emily worked at the Phoenix field office in the Criminal Investigative Division.
 Cheryl Carrera (played by Gina Torres) is the Supervisory Special Agent in Charge of the Crisis Negotiation Unit at the Los Angeles field office of the Federal Bureau of Investigation. She was Matt's partner in crisis negotiation before she was promoted. She was born in Brooklyn, New York to a Cuban father and attended the City University of New York, where she graduated with Bachelor of Science in Political Science. She later attended Columbia University, where she obtained her Master's degree in International Relations and a Ph.D degree in Juridical Science. Prior to working with the FBI, she was an Assistant District Attorney in New York City.
 Frank Rogers (played by Michael Cudlitz) is an FBI special agent and the head of the Special Weapons and Tactics team at the Los Angeles field office of the Federal Bureau of Investigation. He was born in Detroit, Michigan. Before entering the FBI, Rogers was trained at the U.S. Army Combat Training Center and the U.S. Army Ranger School. He served in the Gulf War with the 75th Ranger Regiment. After joining the FBI, he worked at the Dallas Field Office, where he was part of the field office's SWAT team.
 Lia Mathers (played by Raquel Alessi) is an FBI special agent and an intelligence analyst for the Crisis Negotiation Unit at the Los Angeles field office of the Federal Bureau of Investigation. She was born in Seattle, Washington and educated at the California Institute of Technology, where she graduated with a Bachelor of Science in Advanced Computer Studies. She then attended the FBI Academy and received Professional Support Training from the Investigative Computer Unit.
 Duff Gonzalez (played by José Pablo Cantillo) is an FBI special agent and a member of the SWAT team at the Los Angeles field office of the Federal Bureau of Investigation. He was born in East Los Angeles, California and obtained a Bachelor of Science in General Studies from California State University, Fullerton. Before joining the FBI, Duff was formerly a member of the Los Angeles Police Department's SWAT Team.

Production

Broadcast history
Although the show lost more than half of its audience after its premiere, Fox ordered 6 more episodes in November 2006, bringing the total number of episodes to 18 for the season. The show was put on hiatus in December 2006 and was scheduled to return on March 30, 2007 before being pushed back to April 6, 2007. The return date was changed again to June 8, 2007 and was allocated to the 9:00 pm Friday night timeslot. By May 2007, it was reported that Fox canceled the series.

Between episodes 4 and 5, a minor change was made to the intro sequence, so that the silhouette of Ron Livingston's character, which appears back-to-back with that of Rosemarie DeWitt in the show's logo, is depicted with a less pronounced backside starting from the fifth episode onward.

The series aired in the coveted 8:30 PM (then 9:30 PM) Monday night timeslot on Australia's Seven Network over the 2006-07 summer 'non-ratings' period. When that period ended the show was shelved until July–September 2007 when it finished its run in the 10:30 PM (then 11:30 PM) Tuesday timeslot.

Episodes

International broadcasting

References

External links
 
 Standoff Cast and Details - TV Guide

2006 American television series debuts
2007 American television series endings
2000s American crime drama television series
Fox Broadcasting Company original programming
2000s American police procedural television series
Television series by 20th Century Fox Television
Television shows set in Los Angeles
English-language television shows